Howard Michael Mandel (born November 29, 1955) is a Canadian comedian, television personality, actor, and producer. Mandel voiced the character Gizmo in the 1984 film Gremlins and the 1990 sequel Gremlins 2: The New Batch. In 1987, Mandel starred alongside Amy Steel in the comedy film Walk Like a Man. From 1982 to 1988, Mandel played the rowdy ER intern Dr. Wayne Fiscus on the NBC medical drama St. Elsewhere. He also created, voiced and starred in the FOX children's cartoon Bobby's World. Additionally, he has been a judge on NBC's America's Got Talent since 2010, and Citytv's Canada's Got Talent since 2022. He hosted the American NBC and later CNBC game show Deal or No Deal, as well as the show's daytime and Canadian-English counterparts. In 2022, he began hosting the first season of Netflix's Bullsh*t the Game Show.

Early life and education
Mandel was born in Toronto and raised in the Willowdale area of Toronto, Ontario. He is Jewish, and his ancestors emigrated from Romania and Poland. Mandel is a distant cousin of Israeli violinist Itzhak Perlman. His father was a lighting manufacturer and a real estate agent. Mandel attended William Lyon Mackenzie Collegiate Institute, where he was expelled for impersonating a school official and hiring a construction company to build an addition to the school. Afterwards, Mandel worked as a carpet salesman. He was a stand-up comedian at Yuk Yuk's in Toronto, and by September 1978 he had a week-long booking as a featured act, which was billed as "a wild and crazy borderline psychotic." His repertoire included placing a latex glove over his head and inflating it by blowing through his nose, the fingers of the glove extending above his head like a cockscomb. When the audience reacted uproariously to that and similar antics, his trademark response was to extend his arms palms up, look incredulous, and say, "It's you."

On a trip to Los Angeles, Mandel performed a set at The Comedy Store, which resulted in his being hired as a regular performer. A producer for the syndicated comedy game show Make Me Laugh saw him there, and booked Mandel for several appearances during the show's run in 1979 and 1980. He was booked to open for David Letterman at shows in the summer of 1979. CBC-TV's head of variety programming saw his performance in October 1979 and immediately signed him for a TV special. In 1980, he won the lead role in the Canadian movie Gas, co-starring Susan Anspach and Donald Sutherland. Mandel was one of the first "VeeJays" to appear on Nickelodeon's music video series PopClips.

Television and film career

Mandel came to national attention in the United States during a six-year run on St. Elsewhere, starting in 1982 and playing the role of Dr. Wayne Fiscus, opposite Ed Flanders and Norman Lloyd. He also appeared on a week's worth of episodes of the short-lived NBC game show Match Game-Hollywood Squares Hour in March 1984. While working as Dr. Fiscus and continuing to work as a comedian, Mandel also did movies, including providing the voice of Gizmo in the 1984 hit Gremlins and its 1990 sequel, Gremlins 2: The New Batch. In 1985, Mandel made a cameo in the Michael J. Fox directed short "The Iceman Hummeth," which was subsequently broadcast on Late Night with David Letterman in November 1985. In 1986, he starred in A Fine Mess alongside Ted Danson. He performed his stand-up comedy act in several cities (the Watusi Tour), which was followed by his Watusi music video in 1987. For the first two seasons of Muppet Babies, he voiced Bunsen Honeydew, Animal, and Skeeter. He starred alongside Amy Steel in the 1987 comedy film Walk Like a Man. He was also "Maurice" in the 1989 movie Little Monsters. In 1990, he starred in the short-lived sitcom Good Grief on Fox. He was also the creator and executive producer of the Emmy-nominated children's animated series Bobby's World (1990–1998) to which he supplied the voices of the title character and his father. Bobby's World ran for seven seasons on Fox and was later syndicated.

1992 saw the weekly airing of his self-titled comedy show Howie, with multiple guest stars such as Gilbert Gottfried and Little Richard and Lita Ford as the in-house band guitarist. His character Bobby made a regular appearance on the show. In 1994, Mandel voiced the lead character, Little Howie, of the video game Tuneland. He starred in the sketch comedy series Howie Mandel's Sunny Skies in 1995 on Showtime. Mandel appeared in the 1995 Clint Black music video "Summer's Comin'." He played the lead role of the professor in the short-lived TV series The Amazing Live Sea Monkeys, and he guest-starred on a 1996 episode of the ABC TV series Lois & Clark: The New Adventures of Superman as DC Comics supervillain Mister Mxyzptlk. In 1998, he hosted his own syndicated talk show, The Howie Mandel Show, which was canceled after one season. In 1999 to 2000, he played Jason in the film Apocalypse III: Tribulation, was the voice of Jack in the movie The Tangerine Bear in 2000, and in 2002 he played the Sand Man in the movie Hansel and Gretel. In 2006, he appeared as himself as a guest host in a parody of Deal or No Deal in the show-within-a-show of the TV series Studio 60 on the Sunset Strip. In 2007, he guest-starred as himself in an episode of NBC's Medium and made a dream cameo of himself on Deal or No Deal. In that episode, he booted the nighttime drama's protagonist off for "cheating" since in the show, he is a psychic medium and appeared to "know" the contents of the cases. Mandel plays his alter ego, Phil Skorjanc, in most of his comedy shows, which are a fan favorite. Bobby also made a cameo appearance in a February 2007 episode of Deal or No Deal. On a special two-hour Christmas episode, first aired on December 25, 2007, Mandel delivered one line with Bobby's voice, as requested by the contestant.

Mandel's signature stunt as a stand-up comedian (besides his Bobby alter ego) was stretching a latex glove over his head, inflating it with his nostrils, and filling it until it suddenly propelled itself off his head. That trick also lent itself to the title and cover photo of his comedy album Fits Like a Glove (1986). He eventually gave up the routine under doctor's orders after being diagnosed with a perforated sinus. However, in a cameo role as himself on My Name is Earl, he did the routine. He guest-starred in two episodes of Monk ("Mr. Monk Joins a Cult" and "Mr. Monk's 100th Case").

Additional appearances

Mandel is known for his frequent appearances as a comedian and for his hidden camera segments on The Tonight Show with Jay Leno. He has appeared in many television commercials for Boston Pizza as their hired spokesperson. In April 2004, he appeared as number 82 on Comedy Central's list of the 100 greatest stand-up comedians of all time. In October 2005, he was named to be the host of the US version of Deal or No Deal, which debuted on December 19, 2005, on NBC, and became a popular program in early 2006. Mandel also hosts Deal or No Deal Canada; originating from Toronto, Deal or No Deal Canada debuted in January 2007 on Global, which made him one of the few game show hosts (Weakest Link's Anne Robinson, The Chairs John McEnroe, Pyramids Donny Osmond, The Singing Bees Joey Fatone, and Minute to Win Its Darren McMullen being others) to host both a domestic and an international version of the same game show. Mandel joins Alex Trebek, Jim Perry, and Geoff Edwards on the list of game show hosts who emceed one game show simultaneously in Canada and the United States.

In 2007, Mandel made an appearance in an episode of Sesame Street 38th season. That same year, he was parodied on the show as Howie Eatswell, the Muppet host of Sesames game show segment "Meal or No Meal." Mandel has hosted the DVD game version of Deal or No Deal, "Fact or Crap Beat Da Bomb" and "Would You Rather" for Imagination Games.

Mandel had a cameo appearance as himself on the NBC show My Name is Earl in the episode where Earl's roommates robbed an Indian casino at which Mandel was performing. While stealing money, they also kidnapped Mandel. In the episode, Mandel performed his old routine of inflating a rubber glove over his head with his nostrils.

Mandel is a notable alumnus of Beth David B'nai Israel Beth Am's Hebrew School located in Toronto, as well as three other Toronto high schools. Mandel is currently performing a variety/comedy act at the MGM Grand Hotel-Casino in Las Vegas, Nevada.

Starting in 2007, Mandel became a spokesperson for Internet retailer buy.com. He is sometimes featured in a section called "What's Shakin'?" with Mandel. On September 8, 2008, Mandel began hosting a five-day-a-week syndicated daytime version of Deal or No Deal, with a top prize of $500,000. On January 9, 2009, Mandel's reality show Howie Do It premiered on NBC.

On March 31, 2011, Mandel premiered a flash-mob show on Fox called Mobbed. Originally a presentation pilot, the ratings after American Idol prompted Fox to pick up the show for eight to ten episodes.

On November 30, 2012, he hosted the NASCAR Sprint Cup Awards Ceremony. On December 10, 2012, his six-night special game show Take It All premiered.

He appeared in one episode of the animated series Fugget About It as the voice of FBI Agent Rick Chickmagnet in 2013. Since 2013, Mandel has executive-produced the TBS hidden-camera show Deal with It. He also regularly makes appearances and co-hosts the show along with main host Theo Von.

In 2023, Mandel competed in season nine of The Masked Singer as "Rock Lobster". He was eliminated on "ABBA Night" alongside Debbie Gibson as "Night Owl".

Deal or No Deal
In 2003, while Mandel was deciding whether or not to quit show business, the executive producers at NBC asked him to host the show, but he declined many times. They then mailed him a tape of the overseas version and he finally accepted. In 2007, he hosted a five-episode run of the Canadian-English version Deal or No Deal Canada. The show then went to daytime with Mandel remaining as host, although Arsenio Hall was originally intended to host the show. In a January 2009 interview on Anytime with Bob Kushell, Mandel expressed mild, jovial frustration over how some of his contestants hold out during the game show, despite the fact that the grand prize is many times what they would make in a year.

On March 12, 2018, it was announced that Mandel would host the 2018 CNBC revival of the game show and also become an executive producer. The show premiered on December 3, 2018.

Mandel is one of three game show hosts to host the same game show in two different countries, the others being Donny Osmond for Pyramid and Anne Robinson for The Weakest Link.

America's Got Talent
In January 2010, it was announced that Mandel would replace David Hasselhoff as one of the judges on NBC's America's Got Talent after Hasselhoff announced that he was leaving to work on a new television series. Out of all judges on the show, Mandel currently has the longest tenure than any other judge or host, spanning thirteen consecutive seasons (season 5–present).

In October 2021, it was announced that Mandel will be a judge on the second season of Canada's Got Talent, which aired in 2022.

Howie Mandel Does Stuff
Since February 2021, Mandel has hosted the Howie Mandel Does Stuff Podcast with his daughter, Jackelyn Shultz, as co-host. According to the Apple Podcasts preview: "Together, these two make prank calls, discuss pop culture, interview interesting people, say weird things, chat with listeners, get deep..."

Bullsh*t the Game Show 
On April 27, 2022, Netflix released the 10 episode debut season of Bullsh*t the Game Show with Mandel as host of the program. It was Mandel's first game show since the cancellation of the Deal or No Deal revival on CNBC in 2019. In this game show contestants have a chance to win up to $1,000,000 by answering a series of trivia questions but have to also be able to convince ("bullshit") a group of prospective challengers that the answer they give is right, even if it's not. (The contestant is shown whether or not their answer is correct as soon as they choose it.) After explaining their reasoning, the judges will vote on whether they think the contestant is "bullshitting" (lying), or telling the truth. At a certain time after they are done convincing the judges, Mandel will ask the contestant if their answer is correct, or if they were "bullshitting." If the contestant's answer is correct (or if it's incorrect, but they successfully convinced at least one judge that they were telling the truth), they win and move on to the question. If they lie and none of the three judges buy it, they are removed from the game. The next contestant is the judge who most accurately guessed whether or not the contestant was truthful during each question.

Personal life and health

Mandel has been married to Terry Mandel (née Soil) since 1980. Together they have three children: daughters Jackie and Riley and son Alex.

On September 4, 2008, Mandel received a star on the Hollywood Walk of Fame, and Comedy Central listed him as No. 82 on their list of the 100 greatest stand-up comedians of all time.

Mandel received a star on Canada's Walk of Fame in Toronto. The induction ceremony was held on September 12, 2009.

In October 2008, Mandel revealed that he has attention deficit hyperactivity disorder (ADHD) on the morning talk show Live with Regis and Kelly, adding that he is currently working to raise adult ADHD awareness among the general public. On January 12, 2009, Mandel was reportedly sent to St. Michael's Hospital in Toronto suffering from chest pains and what was reported as a minor heart attack. According to various news reports, he was experiencing an irregular heartbeat, but the reports were later revealed as inaccurate. He was later discharged. Mandel has written and published an in-depth autobiography which details his life with OCD, ADHD, and comedy called Here's the Deal: Don't Touch Me.

Mandel is a fan of the Toronto Maple Leafs hockey team.

Mandel is colorblind and a germaphobe. He contracted COVID-19 at the 2022 Kids' Choice Awards, which caused him to miss parts of the third, eighth, and tenth episodes, and the entire seventh episode of the seventeenth season of America's Got Talent. It also led to physical and mental health struggles, including drug and substance abuse.

Mandel lives in the Hollywood Hills neighborhood of Los Angeles.

Obsessive compulsive disorder

Mandel has spoken publicly about having obsessive–compulsive disorder (OCD), which can take many forms, including mysophobia. Mandel's anxiety affects him to the point that he does not shake hands with anyone, including enthusiastic contestants on Deal or No Deal, unless he is wearing latex gloves. Instead of shaking contestants' hands when they offer them, Mandel often opts to exchange fist bumps, put his hands on contestants' shoulders, or give an occasional hug. He once kissed a female contestant on the show for good luck despite his disorder. He now takes medicine to control his condition and even pokes fun at himself for it. On March 24, 2006, he revealed on The Howard Stern Show that his shaved head is not related to natural hair loss but to OCD. He stated that the lack of hair makes him feel cleaner. In the back yard of Mandel's house is a second, smaller house which he had built especially to live in solitude when a family member is sick. During his appearance on Mad TV, Mandel and cast member Bobby Lee made fun of the former's condition. Mandel also confronted his germophobia in Season 4, Episode 1 of the Comedy Central series This Is Not Happening. The show aired on February 3, 2018.

While guest-hosting on Live with Regis and Kelly in 2005, Mandel had an altercation in which his hand was seized by guest Rob Schneider, who condescendingly teased Mandel, stating he needed to 'get over' his phobia. Host Kelly Ripa admonished Schneider on-air, while also obtaining hand sanitizer for Mandel from an audience member.

In September 2007, Mandel interviewed former NFL running back Marshall Faulk on NFL Network. Faulk asked him to shake hands, but Mandel refused, noting he would rather have the fist tap, as he does with Deal or No Deal contestants. Seconds later, Faulk subjected him to a "sneak attack" and shook his right hand. Mandel screamed and walked away from Faulk. He then washed his hands several times. On a guest appearance on Free Radio, Mandel explained that not only is he afraid of public bathrooms, but he is unable to use any bathroom other than his own.

During the ninth episode of season 5 of America's Got Talent in Chicago, contestant Zach Carty attempted an act involving sneezing. Mandel pressed his X button at the beginning of the act and ran into an aisle until the act was over. Carty was unable to perform the act. Mandel kept yelling at the other judges, Piers Morgan and Sharon Osbourne, to press their X buttons and for the audience to turn in his direction. Morgan eventually pressed the X button, but Osbourne refused, so Mandel promptly ran over and pressed her button, ending the act. In a backstage interview, he expressed to the television audience that he receives therapy to help him cope. In another America's Got Talent season 5 incident, Dan Sperry, a contestant on the YouTube quarterfinal depicted in episodes 21 and 22, dropped some dental floss that he had run through his neck as part of a magic act. He dropped the floss in Mandel's vicinity, prompting him to get up and run to the other side of the judges' table. Just before Sperry's next performance in the semifinals, Mandel admitted that it was "the most horrified" he'd been on the show and that his therapist "loves [Dan Sperry]" because there had been two extra sessions that week. During the premiere of season 6, juggler Frank Olivier grabbed Mandel's head to balance himself during a unicycle act. Despite receiving a buzzer from Mandel, Olivier moved on to the next round. Mandel refused to give Olivier any feedback during the judge's voting process.

During AGT 10th-season premiere, contestant Chris Jones directly utilized Mandel's fear of germs as the subject of his hypnotism act. Under the post-hypnotic suggestion that Jones and the other judges were wearing latex gloves, Mandel shook the bare hands of all involved, which elicited shouts of amazement. After viewing the video of the act, Mandel said that he was "upset" and "somewhat betrayed" by the act, but his therapist subsequently said it was a good thing. Jones progressed to the Judge's Cuts where he was eliminated from the competition.

Mandel commented in 2011 that he has struggled with the condition since childhood but did not seek help until he was an adult:

Philanthropy
Mandel started his own charitable foundation called Breakout the Masks, which helps provide personal protective equipment to health care workers fighting the COVID-19 pandemic. He is also involved in Bell's Let's Talk Day initiatives to help people struggling with mental health issues.

Filmography

Film

Television

Comedy specials

Video games

References

External links

 
 

1955 births
Living people
20th-century Canadian comedians
20th-century Canadian Jews
20th-century Canadian male actors
21st-century Canadian comedians
21st-century Canadian Jews
21st-century Canadian male actors
Actors with disabilities
Canada's Got Talent judges
Canadian expatriate male actors in the United States
Canadian game show hosts
Canadian male comedians
Canadian male screenwriters
Canadian male television actors
Canadian male television writers
Canadian male voice actors
Canadian people of Polish-Jewish descent
Canadian people of Romanian-Jewish descent
Canadian people with disabilities
Canadian philanthropists
Canadian sketch comedians
Canadian stand-up comedians
Canadian television producers
Canadian television talk show hosts
Canadian television writers
Comedians from Toronto
Jewish Canadian comedians
Jewish Canadian male actors
Jewish male comedians
Male actors from Toronto
People from Willowdale, Toronto
People with obsessive–compulsive disorder
People with attention deficit hyperactivity disorder